Survivor in Love is the second and final album by Italy-based act Baltimora. The album, released in 1987, was only issued in select countries, such as Italy, Germany, UK, Japan, and Mexico. It was later re-released in 2003 on CD to many more countries, including the United States and Canada due to the current dance/pop uprise in recent years, as well as for Baltimora fans who had not received the original LP in their home countries. The reason the album was not released in certain countries in 1987 was due to the poor sales of the singles (except "Tarzan Boy") on the group's previous album, Living in the Background.

"Key Key Karimba", "Global Love" and "Call Me in the Heart of the Night" were released as singles from the album.

"Call Me in the Heart of the Night" was included on the 1988 Dutch various artists compilation Summer 1988 - Flying High! - The Euro Hits Collection.

Track listing

Personnel
Jimmy McShane - vocals
Maurizio Bassi - keyboards, vocals 
Giorgio Cocilovo - lead guitar 
Gaetano Leandro - Keyboards
Dino D'Autorio - bass guitar
Gabriele Melotti - drums

References

1987 albums
Baltimora albums